Queen Jindeok of Silla (?–654), reigned as Queen of Silla, one of the Three Kingdoms of Korea, from 647 to 654. She was the kingdom's 28th ruler, and its second reigning queen following her predecessor Queen Seondeok. During her reign, Silla jockeyed with Baekje for favor in the Chinese Tang court. She is also known for writing a poem of the Emperor Gaozong of Tang. Accroding to Samguk Sagi, she was voluptuous, beautiful and tall.

Reign

Queen Jindeok (r. 647–654) ascended the throne and became the Silla's second Queen regnant after Queen Seondeok. The last monarch from the ranks of the Seonggol, the highest class in the Silla's unique caste system, her real name is Seungman. Her father was Kim Gukban, who was King Jinpyeong's youngest brother, and her mother was Lady Wolmyeong. During her seven-year reign Queen Jindeok's primary concern was foreign policy. With the help of general Kim Yushin she was able to strengthen Silla's defenses and greatly improve her kingdom's relations with Tang China. Those efforts laid the foundation for the unification of the three kingdoms (Silla, Baekje, and Goguryeo).

She also expanded the Pumju tax-collecting system.

Her tomb is located on the hill in Gyeongju city. Although some historians have doubt that if it is really the tomb of Queen Jindeok. According to the Samguk Sagi she was buried at Saryangbu, which is located in the opposite direction from the tomb.

Legacy
When King Jeonggang was dying in 887, he appointed his sister Jinseong as his heir, justifying the choice of a female monarch by pointing at Seondeok's and Jindeok's successful reigns.

The name of an era 
Queen Jindeok used the era name, Inpyeong, from January to July in 647, when she was crowned, and changed the era name as Taehwa. From July 647 to June 650, she used the Taehwa era, but later she used Yeonghwi, the era that was used during the Tang dynasty. Taehwa is the last name that Silla has used independently.

Family
Grandfather: Crown Prince Dongryun (동륜태자), son of King Jinheung of Silla, 24th ruler of Silla, and Queen Sado of the Park clan (사도왕후 박씨)
Grandmother: Lady Manho of the Kim clan (만호부인 김씨)
Uncle: Jinpyeong of Silla, 26th ruler of Silla
Cousin: Queen Seondeok of Silla, 27th ruler of Silla
Cousin: Princess Cheonmyeong of Silla
Cousin-once-removed: Muyeol of Silla, 29th ruler of Silla
Father: Galmunwang Gukban
Mother: Lady Wolmyeong of the Park clan

Ancestry

In popular culture
 Portrayed by Son Yeo-eun in the 2012–2013 KBS1 TV series Dream of the Emperor.
 Portrayed by Na Mi Hee in the 2017 KBS TV series Chronicles of Korea.
 She is a recruitable general in the mobile war game Evony: The King's Return.
 Portrayed in the 2021 webnovel titled Queen Jindeok by author Glorian C. Regnare.

See also
 History of Korea
 List of Koreans
 Three Kingdoms of Korea

References

Sources

Silla rulers
Queens regnant in Asia
7th-century women writers
7th-century writers
7th-century women rulers
Princesses of Silla
7th-century Korean monarchs
7th-century Korean women